The Middlesex County Courthouse in Saluda, Virginia was built in 1852.  It was listed on the National Register of Historic Places (NRHP) in 1978.  The courthouse building "is a late but significant example of the arcaded-plan courthouse which had its precedent in Virginia's colonial courthouses and earliest civic buildings."

The NRHP listing included three contributing buildings:  the courthouse, a clerk's office, and a jail.  And it included one other contributing structure, which is a Confederate Civil War monument.

John P. Hill was builder of the courthouse building and was paid $1.010.95 out of a sheriff's levy of taxpayers to provide for that purpose.  William R. Jones was builder of the jail.

See also
Middlesex County Courthouse (Urbanna, Virginia), its colonial era precedent also known as Old Middlesex County Courthouse, which was built starting in 1745.

References

Courthouses on the National Register of Historic Places in Virginia
Government buildings completed in 1852
Buildings and structures in Middlesex County, Virginia
County courthouses in Virginia
National Register of Historic Places in Middlesex County, Virginia
1852 establishments in Virginia